Scott Asimus (born 27 March 1976) is an Australian former professional rugby league footballer who played for the North Queensland Cowboys and Northern Eagles in the NRL.

A prop from Maitland, Asimus started out at the Newcastle Knights, where he played in the lower grades.

Asimus played three seasons of first-grade, at North Queensland in 1999, then the Northern Eagles in 2000 and 2001.

Since leaving the NRL, Asimus has worked as a teacher in the Hunter Region.

References

External links
Scott Asimus at Rugby League project

1976 births
Living people
Australian rugby league players
Australian schoolteachers
North Queensland Cowboys players
Northern Eagles players
Rugby league players from Maitland, New South Wales
Rugby league props